Curtain Call is a 1998 romantic comedy directed by Peter Yates, photographed by Sven Nykvist and edited by Hughes Winborne. It stars James Spader, Polly Walker, Michael Caine and Maggie Smith. The film was later re-released under the title It All Came True. It was to be Peter Yates' last film made for cinema, although in most markets it went directly to TV or home video.

Plot
Stevenson Lowe (James Spader) has a publishing business that's in trouble and a girlfriend (Polly Walker), who is also being pursued by a U.S. Senator (Sam Shepard). Stevenson buys a townhouse, for himself, which disappoints her. A pair of quarrelsome ghosts, Max Gale (Michael Caine) and Lily Marlowe (Maggie Smith), who once worked in the theatre, now quarrel with each other while advising Stevenson why marriage is a bad idea.

Cast
James Spader as Stevenson Lowe
Polly Walker as Julia
Michael Caine as Max Gale
Maggie Smith as Lily Marlowe
Buck Henry as Charles Van Allsburg
Sam Shepard as Will Dodge
Frank Whaley as Brett Conway
Marcia Gay Harden as Michelle Tippet
Frances Sternhagen as Amy
Phyllis Somerville as Gladys
Julianne Nicholson as Sandra Hewson
Susan Berman as Miriam

References

External links

1998 films
1998 romantic comedy films
Films directed by Peter Yates
Films with screenplays by Todd Alcott
American romantic comedy films
1990s English-language films
1990s American films